Abadía is a Spanish surname. Notable people with the surname include:

Agustín Abadía (born 1962), Spanish footballer
Guillermo Abadía Morales (1912–2010), Colombian linguist, academic, folklorist and anthropologist
Miguel Abadía Méndez (1867–1947), President of Colombia

Spanish-language surnames